El Carmen Rivero Tórrez is a small town in Bolivia. In 2010 it had an estimated population of 3096.

References

Populated places in Santa Cruz Department (Bolivia)